Düz Rəsullu (also, Düzrəsullu and Dyuzrasullu) is a village and municipality in the Gadabay Rayon of Azerbaijan.  It has a population of 1,237.  The municipality consists of the villages of Düz Rəsullu, Gərməşeyli, Göyəmli, Rəhimli, Hüseynqulular, and Təkyemişan.

References 
The village was founded in 1493. This village has more than 500 years history.

Populated places in Gadabay District

The village was founded in 1493. This village has more than 500 years history.